"Lágrimas negras" (Spanish for Black Tears) is a bolero-son by Miguel Matamoros, first recorded by the Trío Matamoros in 1931. The song was written in Santo Domingo, Dominican Republic, in 1930, when Matamoros was on his way back to Cuba from the Ibero-American Exposition of 1929. The song has been described as the "perfect fusion of the son with the bolero". It became the Trío Matamoros' most famous song, along with "Son de la loma".

Recordings

 Trío Matamoros
 Adalberto Álvarez
 Azul Azul
 Rubén Blades
 Compay Segundo (also in duo with Cesária Évora)
 Celia Cruz
 Celina González
 Dan Den
 Barbarito Díez
 José Feliciano
 Olga Guillot
 Orquesta Aragón
 Omara Portuondo
 María Dolores Pradera (also in with Cachao and Diego el Cigala)
 Rachael Price
 Adalberto Santiago
 Los Tres
 Bebo Valdés, Cachao and Carlos "Patato" Valdés: El Arte del Sabor
 Bebo Valdés & Diego el Cigala with Paquito D'Rivera: Lágrimas negras
 Chucho Valdés and Irakere
 Cuco Valoy
 María Teresa Vera
 Vieja Trova Santiaguera
 El Chacal

References

External links
 Lagrimas Negras, Trio Matamoros, Youtube
 Story of Lagrimas Negras, Predicado.com (in Spanish)
 Lagrimas Negras Lyrics (Spanish and English)
 Grand Kallé & L'African Team - Lagrimas Negras

1930 songs
1931 singles
Cuban songs
Boleros